The following is a list of mayors of the city of João Pessoa, in Paraíba state, Brazil.

 Jovino Limeira Dinoá, 1895-1900 
 Francisco Xavier Júnior, 1904-1908 
 , 1908-1911 
 José Bezerra Cavalcanti, 1912-1916 
 Demócrito de Almeida, 1916 
 Antônio Pessoa Filho, 1916-1917 
 Diógenes Gonçalves Pena, 1918-1920
 , 1920-1924, 1935 
 , 1924-1926 
 , 1926-1928 
 , 1928-1930 
 Joaquim Pessoa Cavalcanti de Albuquerque, 1930-1931 
 , 1931-1934 
 , 1935-1936	
 , 1936-1938	
 , 1938-1940
 , 1940
 Francisco Cícero de Melo Filho, 1940-1945
 Osvaldo Pessoa Cavalcanti de Albuquerque, 1945, 1948-1951
 Luís de Oliveira Lima, 1945-1946, 1951-1955
 Manuel Ribeiro de Morais, 1946
 , 1946-1947
 José Targino, 1947
 Severino Alves da Silveira, 1947
 , 1955-1959
 , 1959-1963
 Domingos Mendonça Neto, 1963-1966
 Damásio Barbosa de Franca, 1966-1971
 , 1971-1974
 Luís Alberto Moreira Coutinho, 1974	
 Hermano Augusto de Almeida, 1975-1979
 Damásio Barbosa da Franca, 1979-1983
 , 1983-1985
 , 1986-1988
 Wilson Braga, 1989-1990
 Carlos Mangueira, 1990-1992	
 , 1993-1996 
 , 1997-2004 
 Ricardo Coutinho, 2005-2010
 , 2010-2012
 , 2013-

See also
 
 João Pessoa history (in Portuguese)
  (state)
 List of mayors of largest cities in Brazil (in Portuguese)
 List of mayors of capitals of Brazil (in Portuguese)

References

This article incorporates information from the Portuguese Wikipedia.

Further reading
 

Joao Pessoa